
Year 246 (CCXLVI) was a common year starting on Thursday (link will display the full calendar) of the Julian calendar, the 246th Year of the Common Era (CE) and Anno Domini (AD) designations, the 246th year of the 1st millennium, the 46th year of the 3rd century, and the 7th year of the 240s decade. At the time, it was known as the Year of the Consulship of Praesens and Albinus (or, less frequently, year 999 Ab urbe condita). The denomination 246 for this year has been used since the early medieval period, when the Anno Domini calendar era became the prevalent method in Europe for naming years.

Events 
 By place 
 Roman Empire 
 Emperor Philip the Arab fights the Germans along the Danube River.
 The first of two Councils of Arabia in the Roman Christian Church is held in Bostra, Arabia Petraea.

 Korea 
 Baekje Kingdom under King Goi of Baekje attacks the Chinese commandery of Daifang.

Births 
 Cao Huan, Chinese emperor of the Cao Wei state (d. 303)

Deaths 
 Dong Yun (or Xiuzhao), Chinese general and politician
 Gu Tan (or Zimo), Chinese official and politician (b. 205)
 Jiang Wan (or Gongyan), Chinese general and statesman

References